Ljubomir Savevski (born 1 January 1957) in Skopje is a Macedonian former handball player and a current head coach of the North Macedonia women's national handball team. He has coached Kometal Gjorče Petrov Skopje and the Macedonian national women's and men's teams.

Achievements
Kometal Gjorce Petrov
Macedonian League: 3
Winner: 2006, 2007, 2008
Macedonian Cup: 3
Winner: 2006, 2007, 2008

References

Living people
Macedonian male handball players
1957 births
Sportspeople from Skopje